Quintessenz Leipzig Flute Ensemble is a flute quintet from Leipzig, Germany. Its members are five musicians of Gewandhausorchester Leipzig, MDR Symphony Orchestra, and Staatskapelle Halle. The group plays music from every musical epoch and nearly every style.

History 

Quintessenz Leipzig Flute Ensemble was founded in 1996. The British a cappella-band King’s Singers, and the Bamboozles, a flute quintet of five students of Trevor Wye, served as examples. The idea of an ensemble that consisted of musicians who played the same instruments in different voices excited the five flutists from Leipzig.

At first, Quintessenz met in private to play Jazz. As they all are trained as classical musicians and not as jazz flutists, they soon developed a characteristic sound. From the beginning, everything they played had their classical education as its basis.

Without sheet music for flute quintets, Quintessenz began arranging their own musical pieces. They used music for quintets of different instruments and also adapted symphonic pieces, piano literature, and completely different music genres. Thus they began to compile their own programs.

In 1999, Quintessenz recorded their first CD, followed by three more. In 2006, the ensemble was invited by Trevor Wye to the flute festival of the British Flute Society in Manchester. Since then, they have performed at various international festivals, inter alia in New York City in August 2009, hosted by the National Flute Association of the United States.

A few years ago, Quintessenz started to focus on the support of young flutists. In cooperation with the regional music council and the Jeunesses Musicales Germany they hosted several workshops for flute chamber music.

Programs 

Because of their particular music style, the Quintessenz programs also have a special character. There is always a main topic or theme that organizes the repertoire. This theme can be related to both music or composers (Mozartimento), but also countries (America!) or literary themes (Tour de France). In addition to that, Quintessenz has several special programs that combine music and poetry (Hymn to fish, All those birds). For those, they are assisted by professional stage actors who recite poems to the respective topic.

A special form of these programs is the "musical promenade". The audience is invited to walk through the landscape together with “Quintessenz”, playing music at different places. 
Additional programs are for example "A Midsummer Night's Dream" – the program for the Mendelssohn year 2009. Parts of the music of the Midsummer Night's Dream are the frame, replenished with pieces about summer, night, and elves.

Members

Anna Garzuly 
Anna Garzuly was born in Szombathely, Hungary. She studied in Budapest, Munich, and New York City. Her teachers included Paul Meisen and Jeanne Baxtresser. Garzuly has been the Associate Principal Flute of the Gewandhausorchester in Leipzig since 1995. She has won numerous prizes at international competitions such as those in Scheveningen, Kobe, Budapest and Geneva. Anna Garzuly is much in demand as a soloist, teacher and as a competition judge. She is the principal flute of the Quintessenz ensemble.

Jérémie Abergel 
Jérémie Abergel was born in  Paris, France. He studied in Berlin at the Hochschule für Musik Hanns Eisler, in Freiburg and in Frankfurt.
Shortly after completing his studies, he began his professional career as both a chamber and orchestral musician, performing in orchestras such as the Dresdner Philharmonie, Deutsche Oper Berlin, Konzerthaus Berlin and the MDR Sinfonieorchester. He played with the Gewandhausorchester Leipzig for three years. Following a short engagement in Chemnitz, he took the position of principal piccolo at the Staatsoper Hannover. 
Since 2019 he is a member of the Bayreuther Festspiele orchestra and the Leipzig flute ensemble, Quintessenz.

Manfred Ludwig 

Manfred Ludwig was born in Erding, Bavaria. He studied in Munich at the Richard Strauss Conservatory with Phillippe Boucly and at the Hochschule für Musik und Theater Hannover with Prof. Andrea Lieberknecht and Gudrun Hinze.
In 2008 he joined the Academy of the Bayerische Staatsoper München. After several years as acting Co-principal Flute for the Gewandhausorchester Leipzig, he was appointed as second flute in 2013. He has played with Quintessenz since 2016.

Bettine Keyßer 
Born in Potsdam, Bettine Keyßer studied flute with Dietrich Hoenow in Berlin, with Eric Kirchoff as well as in Birmingham, Alabama as the student of Sheryl Cohen. Keyßer was principal piccolo player of the Norddeutsche Philharmonie Rostock before becoming assistant principal flute of the Staatskapelle Halle starting in 1999. Today, she is performing the alto flute with Quintessenz.

Christian Sprenger 
Christian Sprenger is a native of Berlin. After completing his studies with Werner Tast in 1989 his career began with the Leipzig Gewandhausorchester as assistant principal flutist. In 1995 he became principal flutist of the MDR-Sinfonieorchester. Sprenger has also won several prizes in various competitions. He pursues an active career as soloist and chamber ensemble player with concert tours in the United States, Turkey, Italy, and England. He is the bass player and head of the ensemble Quintessenz.

Discography 

 1999: Bonsoir
 2003: Arabesques
 2006: America!
 2007: Tour de France

Notes

External links 
  Official Website
 "Flute Focus" Magazine CD Review "Tour de France"
 Album review "Tour de France"
 Label homepage "Genuin"

Musical groups established in 1996
German classical flautists